Bihla is a village located in the Ludhiana West tehsil, of Ludhiana district, Punjab, India. It is said to be established by two brothers named Bihla Singh and Poola Singh. The village is divided into two "patees" named after them respectively.

Gurudwara

Administration
The village is administrated by a Sarpanch who is an elected representative of village as per constitution of India and Panchayati raj (India). As per stats 2019, Bilha villages fall under Gill assembly & Ludhiana parliamentary constituency. Police Station Sadar, Ludhiana has jurisdiction of the village

Cast
The village constitutes 43.05% of Schedule Caste and the village doesn't have any Schedule Tribe population. Whereas remaining village is dominated by the Grewal cast of Jatt Sikh

Villages in Ludhiana West Tehsil

Air travel connectivity 
The closest airport to the village is Sahnewal Airport.

External links
  Villages in Ludhiana West Tehsil

References

 Villages in Ludhiana West tehsil